Erwin Vandenbergh (born 26 January 1959) is a Belgian retired footballer who played as a forward. Between 1979 and 1991, he finished six times topscorer of the Belgian First Division (a record as of 2020), with three clubs (the first three with Lierse, the following two with Anderlecht, and the last one with Gent). In 1980, he was European topscorer with 39 goals out of 34 games. As a Belgium national team regular, Vandenbergh scored a memorable victory goal against Argentina in the opening game of the 1982 World Cup in Spain.

Vandenbergh also played for the French club Lille with his Belgium national team partner Filip Desmet under the management of another fellow Belgian Georges Heylens. His son, Kevin Vandenbergh, has also become a professional football striker.

Honours 
Anderlecht
 Belgian First Division: 1984–85, 1985–86
 Belgian Super Cup: 1985
 UEFA Cup: 1982–83; runners-up 1983–84
 Jules Pappaert Cup: 1977, 1983, 1985
 Bruges Matins: 1985

Belgium
 UEFA European Championship: runners-up 1980
 FIFA World Cup: fourth place 1986
 Belgian Sports Merit Award: 1980

Individual
 Belgian First Division top scorer: 1979–80 (39 goals), 1980–81 (24 goals), 1981–82 (25 goals), 1982–83 (20 goals), 1985–86 (27 goals), 1990–91 (23 goals)
 European Golden Shoe: 1979–80 (39 goals)
 Ballon d'Or nominations: 1980, 1983
 Belgian Golden Shoe: 1981
UEFA Cup top scorer: 1982–83 (seven goals)
 UEFA Euro 1984 qualifying: Group 1 top scorer (four goals)
Best AA Gent-Player of the Season: 1990–91

References

External links
 
 
 
 

1959 births
Living people
Flemish sportspeople
Belgian footballers
Association football forwards
Belgium international footballers
Belgian Pro League players
Lierse S.K. players
R.S.C. Anderlecht players
Lille OSC players
Ligue 1 players
Belgian expatriate footballers
Expatriate footballers in France
K.A.A. Gent players
R.W.D. Molenbeek players
UEFA Euro 1980 players
1982 FIFA World Cup players
UEFA Euro 1984 players
1986 FIFA World Cup players
UEFA Cup winning players